Daya-Nand Verma (25 June 1933, Varanasi – 10 June 2012, Mumbai) was a mathematician at the Tata Institute of Fundamental Research during the period 1968-1993. The construction of Verma modules appears in his Ph.D. thesis as a student of Nathan Jacobson at Yale University.

Select publications
.
.
.
.

References

External links
 Math Genealogy Project
 Oberwolfach Photo Collection.
 Department of Mathematics, India Institute of technology Bombay, Annual report 01-01

 D_n_Verma: Daya-Nand Verma, On-Line Encyclopedia of Integer Sequences

1933 births
2012 deaths
Yale University alumni
Scientists from Varanasi
20th-century Indian mathematicians